Romania has no official motto. Between the years 1859 and 1866 there were several mottos placed on the several coats of arms of the country (like Toți în unu – "All in one"). From 1866 (when the prince Carol I became sovereign of Romania) until 1947 (when the Kingdom was abolished by force by the communists), the official motto was the one of the House of Hohenzollern-Sigmaringen: Nihil Sine Deo ("Nothing Without God" in Latin). During the communist regime the country had no motto.

Romanian institutions and their mottos 
 Ministry of Foreign Affairs: Semper Fidelis Patriae ("Always Loyal to the Motherland")
 Ministry of National Defense: Honor et Patria or Onoare şi Patrie ("Honor and Motherland")
 Ministry of Interior and Administrative Reform: Pro Patria et Ordine Iuris ("For the Motherland and the Rule of Law")
 The Romanian Police: Lex et Honor ("Law and Honor")
 The Romanian Inspectorate for Emergency Situations: Audacia et Devotio ("Courage and Devotion")
 The Romanian Border Police: Patria et Honor ("Motherland and Honor")
 The Romanian Gendarmerie: Lex et Ordo or Lege si Ordine  ("Law and Order")
 Ministry of Justice: Justitia Est Fundamentum Regnorum ("Justice is Fundamental to Reign")
 The Protection Service: Semper Fidelis ("Always Faithful")

Other mottos 
 Order of the Star of Romania: In Fide Salus

See also 
The coats of arms of the respective institutions

References 

Romania
Government of Romania